Andrea Menniti Ippolito (Camposampiero, 25 August 1992) is an Italian rugby union player.
His usual position is as a Fly-Half and he currently plays for Fiamme Oro in Top10 after the experience with Rovigo Delta.

For 2013–14 Pro12 season, he named like Additional Player for Benetton Treviso in Pro 12.

In 2016 and 2018 Menniti Ippolito was named in the Emerging Italy squad for annual World Rugby Nations Cup.

References

External links 
It's Rugby English Profile
Ultimate Rugby Profile

People from Camposampiero
Italian rugby union players
1992 births
Living people
Rugby union fly-halves
Sportspeople from the Province of Padua
Petrarca Rugby players
Rugby Rovigo Delta players